Konstantin Zaivelevich Lerner  (28 February 1950, Odessa, Ukraine, former USSR – 24 September 2011, Herzlia, Israel) was a Ukrainian chess grandmaster (GM). In 1978 and 1982, he was Ukrainian Champion. 

He played in several Soviet Union championships, and his best achievement was second place, behind Andrei Sokolov, at Lvov in 1984.

Lerner won or shared first place in many tournaments, among others at Polanica Zdrój 1985 and 1986 (Rubinstein Memorial), Tallinn 1986, Moscow 1986, Genova 1989, Copenhagen 1990, Gausdal 1992, Mykolaiv 1995 (zonal), Berlin 1997, Graz 1997, Recklinghausen 1999, Bad Wörishofen 2000, Tel Aviv 2001 and 2002, Rishon Le Zion 2004, Givatayim 2005 (Ettinger Memorial), and Herzlia 2005 (Arye Urieli Memorial).

In 2004, he tied for third-fourth at the Israeli open championships in Ramat Aviv. He won the bronze medal at the 2005 Maccabiah Games. He was awarded the GM title in 1986.  The website Chessmtrics.com, which estimates the strength of older players, indicates that he was ranked 7th in the world in 1986.

He arrived in Israel in 2001 and lived there for 10 years, playing for Kefar-Saba chess club, until his death in 2011. In his last days he suffered from several health problems.  He died in Herzlia, Israel in 2011, aged 61.

See also
 List of Jewish chess players

References

External links
 
 

1950 births
2011 deaths
Israeli Jews
Chess grandmasters
Ukrainian chess players
Soviet chess players
Jewish chess players
Ukrainian Jews
Sportspeople from Odesa
Competitors at the 2005 Maccabiah Games
Maccabiah Games medalists in chess
Maccabiah Games bronze medalists for Ukraine